The 2010 UEFA Futsal Championship was the seventh official edition of the UEFA-governed European Championship for national futsal teams. It was hosted by Hungary, between January 19 and January 30, 2010, in two venues located in Budapest (Papp László Sportaréna) and Debrecen (Főnix Arena). For the first time, twelve teams competed in the final round, after a qualifying phase where eleven teams managed to join the Hungarian hosts.

Having won against Portugal in the group stage, the title holders Spain defeated them again in the final, 4–2, to claim a third consecutive and fifth overall title.

Bids
The Hungarian bid was selected during a meeting of UEFA's Executive Committee, on November 30, 2007, in Lucerne, Switzerland. The bid was picked ahead of three other entries from Belgium (Charleroi and Antwerp), Bosnia and Herzegovina (Sarajevo) and Turkey (Istanbul).

Qualification

Thirty-eight nations took part in the qualifying round, with hosts Hungary  automatically qualified for the expanded 12-team final tournament.

Qualifying was played in two stages, with 16 sides competing in the preliminary round between 14–22 February 2009. The winners of the four groups and two best runners-up progressed to join the other 22 entrants in the next phase. In the main qualifying round, which took place between 19–22 March, there was seven groups of four with the first-placed teams and four best runners-up advancing to the final tournament.

Qualified teams

1 Bold indicates champion for that year

Venues

Squads

Each nation had to submit a squad of 14 players, at least two of which had to be goalkeepers. However, Azerbaijan were an exception, since they took part in the tournament with only 12 players.

Final tournament

Group stage

Group A

Group B

Group C

Group D

Knockout stage

Quarter-finals

Semi-finals

Third place play-off

Final

Champions

Final ranking

Awards

Top goalscorers

References

External links
 6th UEFA Futsal Championship - Hungary 2010, Futsal Planet
 Official UEFA website

 
2010
2010
UEFA
Fut
International sports competitions in Budapest
Sport in Debrecen
January 2010 sports events in Europe